The 1941 Langston Lions football team was an American football team that represented Langston College as a member of the Southwestern Athletic Conference during the 1941 college football season. In their 12th season under head coach Caesar Felton Gayles, the Lions compiled an overall record of 9–1–1 with a mark of 4–1–1, placing second in the SWAC behind Prairie View, who they played to a scoreless tie on November 22. Langston finished the season with a win over Morris Brown in the Vulcan Bowl on New Year's Day 1942.  The Lions shut out seven of 11 opponents and outscored opponents by a total of 147 to 45 for the season. The 1941 Langston team was recognized as the black college national champion.

Schedule

References

Langston
Langston Lions football seasons
Black college football national champions
Langston Lions football